Giuseppe Barbaro (born May 24, 1956 in Platì), also known as  ("the Disappeared"), is a boss of the 'Ndrangheta, a Mafia-type criminal organisation based in Calabria, Italy. He is a son of Francesco Barbaro, one of leaders of the Barbaro 'ndrina based in Platì. He was included in the list of most wanted fugitives in Italy until his arrest on December 10, 2001.

Head of the clan
When his father was arrested on January 5, 1989, Giuseppe Barbaro gradually took over the leadership of the clan from his aging father while he was on the run.

Platì has been called the "cradle of kidnapping" and the clan was actively involved in the kidnap industry. Seventeen high-profile kidnappings have been attributed to the clan. He is considered to be one of the key players in the complex secretive negotiations with the authorities that returned the freedom to Milan-based entrepreneur Alessandra Sgarella, who was kidnapped on December 11, 1997, and released  after 266 days on September 4, 1998 after paying a USD 5 million ransom.

The money extorted with kidnappings was invested in drug trafficking and construction in northern Italy, in particularly around Buccinasco, near Milan. The clan participated in a cartel of 'Ndrangheta families involved in cocaine trafficking with the Mafia family of Mariano Agate.

Fugitive and arrest
He was on the run since 1987 and in 1992, he was included in the list of the 30 most wanted fugitives in Italy, wanted for murder, kidnapping and mafia association. On December 10, 2001, he was arrested with his wife in an underground bunker in his hometown Platì. He had become a father four times in his fourteen years on the run.

The operation of the Carabinieri in Platì revealed a complex system of caches, bunkers, hidden doors and tunnels in the mountains of Platì and country, used for decades by Barbaro and other families Platì to escape the police. The tunnels – most running parallel to the town's sewer system – were sophisticated and in some places large enough to drive a lorry through. Remote-controlled trap doors lead into houses, some of them uninhabited, enabling the mafiosi to escape from the police. Some of the tunnels emerged outside the town close to woodland, while others open into animal pens and barns on local farms. It is suspected that kidnap victims were held within the complex.

Video games 
Barbaro's name is the basis for Joe Barbaro, one of the main characters in the 2010 video game Mafia II.

References

 Gratteri, Nicola & Antonio Nicaso (2006). Fratelli di Sangue, Cosenza: Luigi Pellegrini Editore 

1956 births
Living people
Barbaro 'ndrina
'Ndranghetisti
People from the Province of Reggio Calabria